Pakistani Punjabi may refer to:
Punjabis in Pakistan
Western Punjabi (disambiguation), several language groups